Arcadia is a closed railway station on the Goulburn Valley railway in the township of Arcadia, Victoria, Australia. The station opened at the same time as the railway from Mangalore to Shepparton on 13 January 1880 and closed on 30 June 1977. The platform was on the west side of the line, with only the dirt mound remaining today.

References

Disused railway stations in Victoria (Australia)